The 2018–19 Tunisian Cup (Coupe de Tunisie) or Beji Caid Essebsi Cup is the 87th season of the football cup competition of Tunisia.
The competition is organized by the Fédération Tunisienne de Football (FTF) and open to all clubs in Tunisia.

First round
Results :

Round of 32

Round of 16

Quarter-finals

Semi-finals

Final

See also
2018–19 Tunisian Ligue Professionnelle 1
2018–19 Tunisian Ligue Professionnelle 2

References

Tunisian Cup
Tunisia
2018–19 in Tunisian football